William McCartney (born in Newmilns) was a Scottish footballer, whose regular position was as an inside left. He played for Rutherglen Glencairn, Ayr, Hibernian, Manchester United, and West Ham United. McCartney played once for Scotland, in a 5–1 win against Ireland in the 1902 British Home Championship. He also represented the Scottish League twice against the English League in 1902 and 1903.

McCartney helped Hibs to win the 1901–02 Scottish Cup, but missed the final due to a broken leg, and the 1903 Scottish league championship. He was transferred to Manchester United in 1903, and then moved to West Ham United after one season.

His single season at West Ham, the 1904–05 campaign, saw him make 28 Southern League First Division appearances. His two goals from open play came home and away against Southampton, and his only other goal for the club came from the penalty spot, against Bristol Rovers on 8 April 1905. He also made one FA Cup appearance for the Irons, a sixth-round qualifying match against Brighton and Hove Albion.

References

External links

London Hearts profile
MUFCInfo.com profile

Year of birth missing
Year of death missing
Place of death missing
Footballers from East Ayrshire
Scottish footballers
Scotland international footballers
Association football inside forwards
Hibernian F.C. players
Manchester United F.C. players
West Ham United F.C. players
Rutherglen Glencairn F.C. players
Scottish Football League players
Scottish Football League representative players
English Football League players
Ayr F.C. players
Lochgelly United F.C. players
Clyde F.C. players